Clyde Football Club is a Scottish semi-professional football club who play in Scottish League One. Formed in 1877 at the River Clyde in Glasgow, the club host their home matches at New Douglas Park, having played at Broadwood Stadium from 1994 until 2022. Their biggest accomplishments were winning the Scottish Cup on three occasions: 1939, 1955 and 1958; they reached the final a further three times, all during a long period based at Shawfield. They have not played in the top division of Scottish football since 1975.

The team are currently managed by Jim Duffy who was appointed in November 2022.

History

1877–1898
The Clyde Football Club was founded and played on the banks of the River Clyde at Barrowfield. Documentary evidence from the SFA and indeed match reports in the Glasgow press clearly show it all began in 1877, and the thread continues unbroken to this day. This is how the SFA recorded Clyde's origins:

Sitting on the edge of Bridgeton, Barrowfield Park lay in a triangle of land enclosed by Carstairs Street, Colvend Street and the river Clyde. The area was an intense mix of chemical, engineering and textile work with a high population density to provide the labour. Although no stadium photographs have emerged, it appears the ground consisted of a grandstand running north–south, a pavilion and tennis courts at the southern end and a bicycle track surrounding the pitch.

Today this area is dotted with industrial units, but also contains a large grassed area, so it may be possible to stand upon a corner of the original Barrowfield pitch. Barrowfield got initially shared with a short-lived team called Albatross.

The club founded then has no resemblance to a modern professional football club. Clyde F.C. was a private members club more akin to a present-day golf or bowling club. Clyde's Secretary, John Graham, was also a noted rower and it seems the club had other sporting and cultural activities besides football.

The first mention of Clyde was in Monday's Evening Times of 17 September 1877:

Although most fixtures were informal, the Scottish Cup had existed since 1873. Soon there would also be the Glasgow Merchants Charity Cup and the Glasgow Cup which in their time were hotly contested major competitions. Clyde entered the 1st Round of the Scottish Cup on 29 September 1877 along with one hundred and one other teams. Third Lanark were the visitors once again, and triumphed 1–0.

On 6 March 1883, the Glasgow Football Association was established (formed to compete with the older - 1877 - rival Edinburgh Association), with Clyde one of the six clubs represented at that first meeting. The club are one of only three founding members clubs still in existence today (with Queen's Park and Rangers).

Clyde joined the Scottish Football League in 1891, its second edition. Following acceptance, Vale of Leven provided the opposition for Clyde's first League fixture on Saturday, 15 August 1891. In a dream introduction to the format Clyde triumphed 10–3, and a mid-table finish saw the club complete a confident season in League football. While it was an undoubted success, Barrowfield revealed its limitations and could not cope with the crowds as many gained illegal entry. Opposition teams complained about the facilities, and it was clear that Clyde would have to do something to appease the League. The club had the pitch dug up in the off season in 1893 to have the clayey surface replaced by ashes to lend additional facilities to the draining powers of the field.

The club enjoyed cup success in local competitions as the 19th century drew to a close. The team won the North Eastern Cup and Graham Cup four times apiece. Both tournaments featured teams from the East End of Glasgow. However, Clyde endured a terrible final season at Barrowfield, finishing bottom of Division 1 with only 5 points, but remained in the top division. The last action at Barrowfield was a friendly against crack opposition in the form of Sunderland on 30 April 1898, ending in a 3–3 draw.

1899–1919
The club left Barrowfield in 1898 and purchased some open ground (Shawfield) directly across the river between the Glasgow neighbourhood of Oatlands and the Lanarkshire town of Rutherglen. The move was largely financed by the club becoming incorporated and issuing shares in "The Clyde Football Club Limited". A grandstand seating of 1500 was nearing completion and embankment works around the pitch were well underway.

Local rivals Celtic provided the first opposition at Shawfield Stadium on 27 August 1898. An attendance of 10,000 witnessed a goalless draw and return gate receipts of £203. The 1899–1900 season saw the team relegated by finishing bottom of top division.

They were Division Two champions in 1904–05 (and runners up in 1903–04 and 1905–06), but there was no promotion until the latter second-place finish. Automatic promotion and relegation was not established until 1921. The following seasons up to World War I would be far more successful and represented the most consistent period of success for the club.

From 1908 to 1913, Clyde were at the top end of Division One and reached the Scottish Cup final in 1910 and 1912. The team placed third in 1908–09 (three points behind champions Celtic) and in 1911–12 and reached further semi finals (in 1908–09 and 1912–13).

The 1910 final was a bitter disappointment. For 83 minutes Clyde (McTurk; Watson & Blair; Walker, McAteer & Robertson; Stirling & McCartney; Chalmers; Jackson & Booth) held a 2–0 lead (Chalmers and Booth both scored). However, Robertson fluffed a clearance off Blair and into his own net. Dundee then netted a last minute equalizer from Langlands. The replay was far more cagey and ended goalless after extra time, but with Dundee looking physically stronger. Chalmers struck after three minutes to give Clyde a 1–0 lead in the third match. Dundee equalized before half time, and as Clyde looked jaded, John Hunter won the cup for Dundee. The 1912 final was a 2–0 defeat to Celtic.

International honours were awarded to Clyde for the first time in March 1909, as William Walker represented Scotland against club mate Jack Kirwan of Ireland at Ibrox (5–0 to Scotland). The Glasgow Charity Cup (in 1910) and Glasgow Cup (in 1914) were won for the first time. Both were highly prestigious competitions before European football was introduced. All six clubs (Celtic, Clyde, Partick Thistle, Queen's Park, Rangers and Third Lanark) were more often than not resident in Division One.

In September 1914, a fire destroyed the grandstand, and with it much of the club's early history. After the war broke out in November 1914, the Scottish League would continue playing. Many players signed up for 'King & Country' – some never returned, such as C. Clunas (2nd Royal Fusiliers), T. Cranston (Black Watch) and W. Sharp (1st Battalion Royal Scots) – and teams like Clyde found it increasingly difficult to field competitive sides and the League eventually reduced back to a single division.

1920–1945
The club had managed to sustain football through the war years, but the Scottish League continued through 1919–21 with only one division. Division Two restarted in 1921–22, with automatic promotion and relegation adopted. Benefits were evident for ambitious teams, but the financial penalties for falling out of the top tier were extremely severe.

Relegated in 1923–24, Clyde spent two seasons playing teams like Armadale, Arthurlie, Bathgate, Bo'ness, Broxburn, and King's Park until promotion (and another Glasgow Cup) in 1925–26. From 1926 to 1939, Clyde remained a Division One club, as the team maintained a respectable mid-table status. International honours returned to Shawfield, as Danny Blair was a prominent Scotland full back of this era and leading goalscorer Billy Boyd (with 32 goals in 1932–33) earned two international caps.

Liquidation was narrowly averted in 1930. Greyhound racing was booming in the 1920s and many clubs used this a way to supplement their income. A company offered to lease Shawfield in 1926 and also give a percentage of the gate money to Clyde, but animal racing was forbidden in the deeds of Shawfield and the League was dead set against the sport in general. Chairman John McMahon would not let go of the idea. After years of wrangling, the Shawfield Greyhound Racing Company Ltd started racing in 1932 and a few years later purchased the stadium from Clyde.

The team conceded a solitary goal on the run to the 1939 Scottish Cup final. Clean sheets were kept against St Johnstone (2–0), Dundee (0–0 at Dens Park, followed by 1–0 in a replay), city rivals Third Lanark (1–0), and the Hibernian semi final match (1–0 at Tynecastle). The single goal against came at Rangers in the 3rd Round, where prolific centre forward Willie Martin set a record for an opposition at Ibrox by scoring all four goals in a 4–1 win.

Clyde (Brown; Kirk and Hickie; Beaton, Falloon and Weir; Robertson and Gillies; Martin; Noble and Wallace) faced Motherwell, who had scored the most goals on route to the final, in front of 94,000 at Hampden on 22 April 1939. After losing the coin toss, Clyde goalkeeper Brown was under the most pressure early on. Assisted by a Robertson delivery, Wallace fired the opener in the roof of the net. Despite further opposition pressure before the interval, Martin doubled the lead with an opportunistic strike after the break. Late goals from Noble (netting from a rebound) and Martin (assisted by Noble for his second) sealed an emphatic 4–0 win and a maiden Scottish Cup triumph.

War with Nazi Germany caused the suspension of the Scottish League in 1939–40, and all players' contracts declared void. Unofficial competitions soon restarted with an East/West regional split. The geographical separation meant Clyde were placed in the Southern League. Runners up behind champions Rangers in 1940–41 (by three points), the team would continue to perform relatively well in warttime competitions.

A second major cup competition, the Scottish League Cup would be inaugurated in 1946. It was the then Clyde and SFL chairman John McMahon who donated the trophy that is still awarded to the winners of the competition to this day.

1946–1969
The club ventured on a 20-match tour of South Africa in 1947 and recorded 16 wins, 2 draws and 2 defeats. Also in 1953, future Ballon d'Or winner Stanley Matthews (and Blackpool teammate Ernie Taylor) turned out for Clyde against Everton in a benefit match at Celtic Park in Belfast.

Leslie Johnston, a then Scotland internationalist, twice broke the Scottish transfer record as a Clyde player in the 1940s.

The team showed steady league form just after the war and reached a fourth Scottish Cup final in 1948–49. In only the fourth edition of the competition since Clyde won it in 1938–39, their opponents Rangers ran out comfortable 4–1 winners in front of a crowd of 108,000 at Hampden, with Peter Galletly scoring Clyde's consolation goal. It was claimed that both Rangers penalties were of a dubious nature.

The 1950s began with relegation from Division A in 1950–51, but returned as Division B champions in 1951–52. The team repeated the feat in 1955–56 and 1956–57. Each occasion saw the team bounce back to solid finishes in Division A. Floodlighting was introduced at Shawfield in March 1954. The first opposition was Huddersfield Town in a friendly match. Huddersfield won 3–2. Domestic cup success came readily in the 1950s. They won the Scottish Cup in 1954–55 and 1957–58 and were beaten semi-finalists in 1955–56 and 1959–60. They also reached Scottish League Cup semi-finals in 1956–57 and 1957–58, but lost on both occasions to Celtic.

The route to the 1954–55 Final began with three straight home victories in the competition against Albion Rovers (3–0), Raith Rovers (3–1) and Falkirk (5–0). Aberdeen provided Clyde's semi-final opponents. After a 2–2 draw at Easter Road, a solitary goal in the replay sent Clyde into the final. On 23 April 1955 at Hampden in front of over 96,000, Celtic, installed as firm favourites, provided the opposition in the final, in a match that was also the first to be televised live. Without forward McPhail and goalkeeper Wilson, Clyde lined up:- Hewkins, Murphy & Haddock; Granville, Anderson & Laing; Divers & Robertson; Hill; Brown & Ring. Celtic held a 1–0 lead with three minutes left until Robertson scored direct from a corner kick to earn a replay. A crowd of over 68,000 gathered for the replay, with the same Clyde line up, a Tommy Ring goal was enough to win a more open affair.

The first half of the League Cup tie with Aberdeen at Shawfield on 3 September 1955 was also televised live (a competition first) by the BBC as an experiment.

Back at Hampden on 26 April 1958 in front of a crowd of 94,000 to face a strong Hibernian team, Clyde lined up:- McCulloch, Murphy & Haddock; Walters, Finlay & Clinton; Herd & Currie; Coyle; Robertson & Ring. A deflected strike from Coyle in poor conditions gave Clyde a 1–0 win and a second Scottish Cup in four seasons and third overall. Fourth place in the final league table and another League Cup semi-final spot completed an impressive season in 1957–58. Haddock, Robertson and Coyle were confirmed in the final Scotland squad for the 1958 FIFA World Cup. Dan Currie was selected in the provisional squad, but did not make the final cut.

Clyde gained entry into the Friendship Cup in 1960. It was an inter-League competition between four clubs each from England, France and Scotland, with results aggregated to provide the 'best' League. It proved to be an unpopular format and ended in 1962. For the record, Clyde was drawn against RC Lens of Ligue 1 and beat them 4–0 away and 2–1 at Shawfield. The club began the 1960s as a yo-yo club. Relegations in 1960–61 and 1962–63 were followed by immediate promotions in 1961–62 and 1963–64, the former as Division Two champions.

At home to Celtic on 10 September 1966, the Clyde team unusually started the match with squad numbers instead of the traditional (1–11) positional numbers on their shirts. The team actually returned from the interval with the routine numbering of 1–11.

The 1966–67 season led Clyde to their highest league finish in forty-five years and another Scottish Cup semi-final appearance. Competing largely as a part-time team, Clyde finished third behind the Old Firm clubs. After producing a wonderful season of football that has marked the high tide in the club's fortunes to date, European football will forever love denying itself. The Inter-Cities Fairs Cup had a rule that stipulated only one team per city could enter. Clyde argued that they were not from Glasgow; they were from Rutherglen. However UEFA denied this argument citing Clyde's non-membership of the Lanarkshire FA and their participation in the Glasgow Cup. Rangers had that position. Another League Cup semi-final was reached in 1968–69. The club journeyed on a 10-match tour of Rhodesia in 1969 and remained unbeaten (9 wins and 1 draw).

As the 1960s came to a close, Clyde was competing rather comfortably in the top division. It was a different story on the terraces with Glasgow's slum clearance programme hitting attendances hard. Large swathes of housing in Bridgeton, Dalmarnock, Gorbals, Oatlands and Rutherglen were being demolished with the inhabitants decanted away to other parts of the city and beyond. Clyde's core support was drawn from these areas, and many of them have never returned to follow the team.

1970–1993
The club began the 1970s as in previous decades, with the threat of relegation of hanging around. In an attempt to quit the city, there was an attempted merger with Hamilton Academical, who were in dire financial trouble and had resigned from the Scottish League. After the move floundered as quickly as it arose, Hamilton quickly rejoined the League. Less than a year later, Dumbarton of Division Two made an audacious bid to merge with Clyde in Division One at the time in return for a cash settlement. The Scottish League quickly quashed the move, after viewing it as Dumbarton trying to gain back-door entry into the top division.

After relegation in 1971–72, many club legends such as Harry Glasgow, Sam Hastings, Tommy McCulloch, Graham McFarlane and Eddie Mulheron moved on. Clyde did recover and won promotion as Division Two champions in 1972–73. Two years in the top division until another relegation in 1974–75 would be their last in the top division to date. The Premier Division was introduced ahead of the season 1975–76 as the new top division, with inclusion based upon league position. A poor 16th-place finish in Division One in season 1974–75 meant Clyde was never in contention. The club now found themselves back in the second tier, now known as the First Division.

The club found a new role, discovering and developing talent before selling it on. Shawfield was the starting point for future Scotland internationalists like Steve Archibald, Ian Ferguson and Pat Nevin. Problems on and off the pitch saw Clyde move into freefall. After finishing bottom of the First Division in 1975–76, they found themselves in the Second Division, the third tier, for the season 1976–77. They only could muster a seventh-place finish. In a decade Clyde had gone from the third best team in Scotland to a single spot above the finishing last in the Scottish football league system. Towards the end of the season, Celtic legend Billy McNeill took charge but left for Aberdeen after only a few months at the helm. The club then turned to the relatively unknown Craig Brown, and he had immediate success as the team won the Second Division in 1977–78.

Problems were arising at Shawfield. The stadium was falling into a state of disrepair, and the grounds were not well maintained. By the late 1970s, Shawfield came into the hands of the Greyhound Racing Association (GRA). Greyhound racing had been in decline since 1963 when off-course betting was allowed. To compensate for this, the GRA had transformed itself into a property company and had a policy of acquiring and redeveloping dog tracks for commercial and residential uses.

They became the first Scottish club to adopt a shirt sponsor in 1979–80. The club secured a deal with the British Oxygen Company. As a guest of the SFA, Fabio Capello worked with manager Craig Brown and the team at Shawfield for a short stint in the early 1980s when he started coaching.

Relegation from the First Division in 1979–80 was followed by another promotion as Second Division champions in 1981–82. Shawfield eventually came on the open market in 1983 with a £500,000 price tag. The club was served with a notice to quit Shawfield by 1986. Alloa Athletic provided the final opposition at Shawfield on 28 April 1986. Clyde claimed a 4–2 win. The unpopular but necessary decision was taken to ground-share with city rivals Partick Thistle. Clyde spent five unhappy seasons at Firhill, and there was a sense of relief when Clyde departed. The club was grateful for the use of Firhill, but there was an underlying sense of being tolerated as an inconvenient annoyance.

The 'Gypsy Army' reference came into being as Clyde supporters sought pride and solace during the club's homeless years. The club then negotiated a ground-share at Douglas Park with Hamilton Academical, where Clyde resided for two and a half seasons as plans were developed and implemented to build a new home in Cumbernauld. Meanwhile, on the field, relegation from the First Division in 1990–91, was followed by promotion again as Second Division champions in 1992–93 and an immediate relegation in 1993–94. However, this continued the tradition of the yo-yo existence the club had become known for at certain times in previous decades.

1994–2022
The Cumbernauld Development Corporation was keen to have a sports stadium and professional football team to promote the town, and Cumbernauld, with a 50,000+ population, seemed fertile ground on which to grow new support. A new site called "Broadwood" was to have an integrated business, housing and leisure development with a football stadium at the heart of it. With the help of Football Trust backing, two modern stands began to emerge during the early 1990s.

The Scottish League unusually granted permission for Clyde to switch grounds mid-season, and former landlords, Hamilton Academical, were the inaugural opposition on 5 February 1994. A capacity crowd of 6000 watched as Clyde lost to the Accies 2–0.

Clyde dropped to the third tier of football, and in 1998 they almost fell into the lowest reaches of Senior football. However, this was enough for the new chairman, Billy Carmichael, to introduce changes. Ronnie MacDonald got appointed as manager, having worked at Maryhill Juniors. MacDonald signed a whole squad from the Junior ranks, and within two seasons Clyde had gained promotion.  Subsequently, Allan Maitland won promotion to the Scottish First Division in 1999.

The 2003–04 season saw Clyde atop the League and looking set for the SPL. But Broadwood did not comply with SPL requirements and crucially Clyde was on the brink of being petitioned by their creditors and liquidated. While the chairman's fortune was well spent on players' wages, very little else got serviced. The SPL relented and said Clyde could join them if the fourth stand got built. North Lanarkshire Council started the groundworks and then abruptly halted them as they became aware of Clyde's financial plight. Plan B, playing at Kilmarnock, was investigated. In the event, a draw with Ayr United and a home loss to Inverness Caledonian Thistle meant that Clyde missed out on promotion.

The Clyde Supporters' Trust formed during the 2003–04 season. Early that season some concerned fans met knowing that the chairman could not keep financing the Club indefinitely. The timing of the Trust's formation coincided with Clyde's failure to gain promotion, and the chairman sought to sell his majority shareholding. Following lengthy negotiations, a consortium of the Trust and traditional investors increased the majority shareholding for a nominal sum. The Clyde Development Consortium took control of funds gathered by fans and investors and used it to finance the Club through a CVA to clear the debts. In June 2005 the CVA was completed, and Clyde was mostly debt free.

In a season, 2005–06, that saw Clyde lead 2–1 from 1–0 behind at Rangers in a League Cup tie with 17 minutes left before a goalkeeping error gifted Rangers an equalizer, with Clyde going on to lose in extra time, the other half of the Old Firm, Celtic visited Broadwood in the Scottish Cup on 8 January 2006. Celtic were such heavy favourites that the game was presented as a gentle introduction for their new signing, Roy Keane. Clyde, however, won 2–1. The goal scorers for Clyde were Eddie Malone and Craig Bryson while Celtic's goal scorer was Maciej Zurawski. Clyde reached the 2006 Challenge Cup Final, their first final for 48 years, since their Scottish Cup success in 1958. They lost the game 5–4 on a penalty shootout, after the game finished 1–1 following extra time.

Former Scotland captain Colin Hendry was appointed manager in summer 2007. On 14 August of that year, Clyde history was made when Michael Doherty became the youngest person ever to play for Clyde in a competitive match, a feat later broken by Connor Stevenson in a league match at Palmerston on 25 April 2009.

Hendry resigned in January 2008, due to family reasons. Former Rangers defender John "Bomber" Brown replaced him as manager. Clyde entered the final game of the season needing to better Morton's result to avoid getting forced into the playoffs. Clyde won their game 3–0, but in a cruel twist of fate, Morton won their own game by the same scoreline, sending Clyde into a two-legged play-off with Second Division side Alloa Athletic. Clyde lost the first leg 2–1 and at 3–1 down in the home second leg looked as good as relegated. However, a thrilling fightback saw Clyde level at 5–5 on aggregate (4–3 on the day) before adding another goal in extra time to progress. Home and away victories over Airdrie United in the play-off final then secured First Division football at Broadwood for another season.

However, the following season Clyde finished bottom of the First Division and got relegated to the Second Division. Meanwhile, off the park, financial problems were once again apparent. In a hope to try and avoid administration in June 2009, Clyde terminated the contracts of the entire first-team squad, with only youngsters remaining under contract at the club. The squad for 2009–10 was rebuilt on a drastically reduced budget with a repeat of open trials which were successful in 2005. However early results were not good, and the board appointed Neil Watt as Director of Football and John McCormack as first team coach. After a brief upturn in results, Clyde went six games without a win, and on Saturday 21 November, with the team sitting three points adrift at the bottom of the Second Division, it was announced that John Brown had left his position as manager. On Monday, 5 April, John McCormack was sacked by Clyde.

More history was made in a home match with Peterhead on 17 April 2010, when Willie Sawyers scored after only eight seconds, which became the fastest Clyde goal ever recorded. Despite this, the club was subsequently relegated for the second season in a row, dropping down to the Third Division where they made a disastrous start to the campaign, including an 8–1 thrashing at the hands of Montrose. On Wednesday 2 February 2011, Stuart Millar was sacked as manager of Clyde. They finished 10th in the Third Division, which at 42nd and last place overall is the lowest position in the Scottish league system.

On 20 April 2013, Clyde's owners voted to move to East Kilbride and rename the club EK Clyde FC, however, this plan would later be abandoned. The 2013–14 season saw a significant improvement on the field when a League One play-off spot was secured in the penultimate league match of the season. In the previous six seasons Clyde had finished in the bottom two positions of every league campaign. However, the club missed out on promotion after a play-off semi-final defeat on penalties to East Fife. Gordon Young became the first Clyde player to score with their first touch on their club debut in a match against Elgin City on 1 March 2014.

Duffy resigned as manager of Clyde on 19 May 2014 to take up the vacant managerial post at Greenock Morton, while John Taylor, a member of the boardroom since 1986, and the club's longest serving director had stepped down in April. In October 2014, the club were declared officially debt free, having accumulated an unsustainable debt of £1.4 million as a result of the club's failed promotion bid to the SPL during season 2003–04, with the burden of debt having weighed heavily on the shoulders of the club for the next decade. Scott Durie became the first Clyde player to play every single minute of every competitive match in a season, during the 2014–15 season.

Former Rangers, Blackburn and Scotland midfielder Barry Ferguson was appointed as player-manager of Clyde in June 2014 and took the club to a 6th-place finish in his first season in charge. Ferguson officially retired as a player towards the end of that season. The following year, Clyde finished 3rd in League Two but got beaten in the playoff final. On 25 February 2017, with the club in 8th place in League Two after a 1–0 defeat to Annan Athletic and with no realistic prospect of gaining promotion after a ten-match winless run, Ferguson resigned as manager of Clyde, with his assistant Bob Malcolm taking interim charge of the side until a new manager was appointed.

After nine years in the bottom tier of Scottish football, at the end of the 2018–19 season, Danny Lennon led Clyde to promotion to Scottish League One, beating Annan Athletic 2–1 on aggregate to win the promotion play-off final.

In April 2022, the club announced they would be leaving Broadwood at the end of the 2021–22 season, ending their 28-year stay in Cumbernauld. They will be ground-sharing with Hamilton Academical at New Douglas Park from the start of the 2022–23 season, with a view of relocating to a new home back in Glasgow in the near future.

Clyde's last match at Broadwood was a defeat by Airdrieonians on 23 April 2022.

Grounds

Barrowfield 

Clyde has had five home grounds since they formed in 1877. The first of these was Barrowfield Park, situated on the banks of the River Clyde between the Glasgow neighbourhoods of Bridgeton and Dalmarnock.

Shawfield  

By 1898, Barrowfield became too small in capacity to deal with the large crowds of spectators. The club then moved across the river to build a new stadium, which would be known as Shawfield Stadium.

A crowd of 10,000 saw the first match at Shawfield against Celtic. In 1908, a group of 52,000 gathered for a game against Rangers, which remains Clyde's record home attendance to this day. Financial pressures led to the club relinquishing ownership of the stadium in 1935, selling it to their former tenants, the Greyhound Racing Association. This arrangement continued satisfactorily for over 50 years until the GRA announced redevelopment plans for the stadium and gave Clyde notice to quit in 1986.

Broadwood 

In 1990, Clyde had secured an agreement to move into a stadium in the new town of Cumbernauld, which due to shifting population patterns was by now one of the larger settlements in Scotland without a senior football team. The new all-seater Broadwood Stadium would not be ready until 1994.

Clyde moved into the venue midway through the 1994–95 season. Broadwood has hosted Scotland U21 matches and four Scottish Challenge Cup finals in the past. Broadwood was also home to Airdrieonians for four seasons from 1994 to 1998 and Rangers reserves for a while.

On 9 December 2010, Clyde had informed their landlords at North Lanarkshire Council (NL Leisure) of their intention to relinquish their lease on Broadwood and move elsewhere. Furthermore, on 19 October 2011, Clyde revealed that they were investigating the possibility of a move to East Kilbride, the largest town in Scotland without a senior football team. Another option was to move back to Rutherglen and develop the Clyde Gateway Stadium in a ground-sharing agreement. This had received approval from current tenants Rutherglen Glencairn.

In April 2022, the club announced they would be leaving Broadwood at the end of the 2021–22 season, ending their 28-year stay in Cumbernauld. They will be ground-sharing with Hamilton Academical at New Douglas Park from the start of the 2022–23 season, with a view of relocating to a new home back in Glasgow in the near future.

Groundsharing 

After the Great War began, in September 1914, a fire completely destroyed the grandstand at Shawfield. Clyde were forced to switch their home games for a while. Celtic, the club's East End neighbours, offered up  Celtic Park as an alternative venue for home games.

After Celtic Park suffered similar damage in March 1929, The club had to play the rest of their matches in the 1928–29 season at nearby Shawfield. (reciprocating an earlier arrangement in 1914 when Clyde suffered similar damage to their ground).

On 1 March 1958 Clyde hosted Celtic in the Scottish Cup. Set for Shawfield, the match was moved to Celtic Park over safety concerns. However, Clyde still had home advantage because the home stand tickets were initially reserved for Clyde ticket holders with Celtic tickets ineligible. The Bully Wee won 2–0 in front of 65,000, with goals from Ring and Currie. The full back pairing of Haddock and Murphy were reported to have been immense.

After quitting Shawfield in 1986, the club investigated several local options. Clyde secured an agreement with arch-rivals Partick Thistle to share their ground Firhill for five seasons until 1991. Despite reaching an agreement to move into Broadwood in 1990, it would not be until 1994 when the ground was ready, so Clyde shared with Hamilton Accies at their Douglas Park for a further three seasons.

The club negotiated a groundshare with Alloa to use Recreation Park for the club's first home game of the 2012–13 season, a first round Challenge Cup match against Partick Thistle. During pre-season work had begun at Broadwood to replace the grass pitch with an artificial surface (astroturf) and the pitch was not finished in time for their first home match of the season. Clyde were confident that the pitch would be completed and all the details finalised for the club's first home league match of the season in time for the visit of Peterhead. The match was switched to Recreation Park for the second successive home game after a pitch inspection carried out earlier in the week by the SFL decided that the pitch was not at the stage of completion as expected. Installation of the new surface was completed in time for the club's next home match of the league season.

Supporters

Clyde Football Club is 100% owned by the supporters.

The supporters' fiercest rivalry is with Partick Thistle, given that the two clubs are both of smaller stature to that of Rangers and Celtic. However, given the success and promotion of Partick Thistle to the Scottish Premiership, and Clyde's recent relegation to the Scottish League Two, such derby games have become a rarity in past years. Both clubs were in League One together in the 2020–21 season.

The number of years Clyde spent without a permanent home of their own led to the fans identifying themselves as the Gypsy Army.

The Clyde Supporters Social Club on Rutherglen Main Street burned down in the early 2000s and has never been rebuilt or re-opened. There was also a Supporters Club located in Kirkintilloch.

The Clyde Supporters' Trust got formed during season 2003–04. A group of fans became aware of the club's severe financial problems as Billy Carmichael's reign as chairman came to an end. It was formed in time to save the club and keep it in the supporter's hands in a time that coincided with Clyde's failure to gain promotion and the chairman looking to sell his majority shareholding.

In the past the Supporters' Trust has financed the signings of players such as John Potter and Tom Brighton, and retaining the signatures of players such as Neil McGregor and David Hutton.

The Clyde supporters also run their own supporters team called Bully Wee United. Bully Wee United are recognised as the official supporters team of Clyde and represent the club in the IFA League with matches well played Saturday mornings. Matches are normally against the supporter's teams of the opposition facing the first team on the same day. Bully Wee United is unique in most Scottish supporters teams as they operate a strict policy that only Clyde supporters may play for the team. Players must attend a minimum number of Clyde games over a season. Clyde is also represented in the Scottish Central Amateur League by another supporters team named Broadwood Clyde. They got formed in 1994. They were crowned SSFL Division One league champions in 2005. They also won the SSFL League Cup in 2004 and SSFL Inter-Division Cup in 2003 making them the most successful Clyde supporters team. Broadwood Clyde play their homes games at Ravenswood in Cumbernauld on Sunday afternoons.

The Clyde View
The Clyde View is Clyde's official matchday programme. It won the Scottish Programme of the Year Award every season from 1995–96 to 2006–07, and again in 2008–09. It also won the Scottish Divisional Programme of the Year Award every season from 1991–92 to 2011–12. It won the inaugural Scottish Divisional Programme Best Design of the Year Award for season 2011–12.

On Wirrel's UK Programme of the Year, it achieved a top ten finish on three consecutive occasions from 2002–03 to 2004–05; 8th (2002–03), 6th (2003–04) and 5th (2004–05).

Nickname
The club's nickname, "The Bully Wee", is of uncertain origin although the club themselves have advanced three theories.

The first suggests that the clubs and supporters and perhaps players mainly came from Bridgeton, Glasgow, a tight working-class area whose inhabitants had a reputation as "wee bullies", with this becoming transposed as the Bully Wee.

Alternatively, it is also claimed that it comes from around 1900 when a group of French supporters paid a visit to Barrowfield and, upon the scoring of a disputed goal, were heard to remark  "But il'y, oui?" or "Their goal, yes". Supporters heard this unfamiliar phrase as "Bully Wee", and the name stuck.

Finally the third theory, and the one accepted by the club as the most plausible, links the term to the old Victorian idiom "bully" meaning first-rate or high standard and suggests that Clyde, a small club, would have been regularly referred to as "Bully Wee Clyde", with the first two words eventually becoming the standalone nickname.

Clyde's supporters also go by the name of "Gypsy Army". Due to the number of years the club spent homeless, rival fans called Clyde fans "gypsies" as a slur. The supporters of Clyde adopted this as a badge of honour and the "Gypsy Army" was born. Despite now having a settled home at Broadwood Stadium the nickname lives on in terracing songs, supporters buses and supporters football teams.

Rivalries 

Historically seen as a Glasgow club, local rivalries (Glasgow derby) were developed and forged with other teams from in and around the city, in particular Celtic (also from the East End), Rangers, Partick Thistle and Queen's Park and the now-defunct Third Lanark.

For most of the 20th century, they were six of leading clubs in the country. More often than not all six clubs reside in the top division, with fiercely contested competitions such as the Glasgow Cup and Glasgow Charity Cup (before European football) on top of national tournaments, it saw the clubs pitted against one another multiple times a season.

A team called Thistle FC, also known Glasgow or Bridgeton Thistle, were early rivals to the club. Formed a decade before Clyde in 1868, Thistle's first ground was situated nearby at the club's original home Barrowfield Park. Thistle's last fixture was a friendly against the full first team of Clyde at Barrowfield before going out of existence in 1894.

The Clyde vs Partick Thistle derby was previously a fierce battle between two of Glasgow's smaller clubs, in comparison to the Old Firm. The rivalry intensified when Thistle became Clyde's landlords at Firhill for five years in the 1980s. The decision to groundshare was never fully accepted by either set of fans. After quitting Clyde on free transfer to sign for the Firhill club (newly promoted to the SPL) in 2002, Jamie Mitchell stated he was shocked by the reaction of Clyde supporters to the move. He referred to it as getting the "Mo Johnston treatment". Former Jags midfielder Scott Chaplain (once a signing target for Clyde) spoke of the "competitive edges to those particular matches" after playing in the fixtures many times. When talking about a possible groundshare again, Partick Thistle chairman David Beattie said it would reignite the Glasgow-rivalry saying "the healthy rivalry between ourselves and the Bully Wee is historical". Due to Partick Thistle's promotion to Scotland's highest professional league, the Scottish Premiership, in the 2010s and Clyde's relegations to the lower leagues in the same period, matches between the two clubs became less common. However, by 2020 they found themselves in the same division (Scottish League One) once again, with a revived version of the Glasgow Cup also offering more meetings.

During the 2010s, Queen's Park became the natural rivals to Clyde, as both clubs were stuck in the bottom league (fourth tier) for the majority of the decade. From 2010 to 2016, Clyde were on a demoralising run of results against Queen's Park: the Spiders won 17 and drew 3 of the 26 matches. This included a run of 11 successive wins (scoring 29 goals in that run).

Geographically classed as a North Lanarkshire club since the 1994 move to Cumbernauld, Clyde's matches against Airdrieonians, Albion Rovers, Motherwell or Hamilton Academical can be considered a Lanarkshire derby.

Managers

The club has appointed 30 full-time managers in its history.

First-team squad

On loan

Club officials

Board
Chairman: Gordon Thomson
Vice-Chairman/Medical Director: David MacPherson
Operations Director/Company Secretary: John Taylor
Finance Director: Greg Callan
Commercial Director: Charlie Lowrie
Director of Corporate Governance and Communication: Bryan Macpherson
Director for Child Wellbeing & Protection and Safeguarding: Graeme Kelly
Directors: Ian Letham, Gordon Nisbet

Coaching staff
Manager: Jim Duffy
Assistant Manager: Stephen Swift
First Team Coach: Brian McLean
Goalkeeping Coach: James Evans
Head of Football Operations: Graham Diamond
Head of Recruitment: PJ Corr
Video Analyst: Andy Muir
Kitman: Ian Elliott
Assistant Kitman: Lewis Kenna
Head of Physiotherapy: Iain McKinlay
Physio: Alistair Gray
Sports Therapist: Alannah MacPherson

Reserve and youth teams

Reserve League Cup
Clyde put together a reserve team for the SFL's Reserve League Cup competition, which included a mixture of first team fringe players and youngsters. The club won the Reserve League Cup for the first time in May 2008. They defeated Livingston 4–1 on their own ground at Almondvale with Dave McKay scoring all four goals for Clyde. It was the team's first piece of silverware at reserve level for twenty years. The following season the club were knocked out by Ross County in the semi-finals losing 3–0 in Dingwall.

Reserve team history

'A' Team
It was common from the beginning of reserve football for the majority of club's reserve teams (second XI's) to go by the tag ‘A’ or sometimes ‘B’ or even ‘C’ if a club had more than one reserve side. It wasn't until after the formation of the new Scottish Reserve League in 1955 that today's reserve teams go by the actual tag ‘reserves’ and have done since 1957.

During the 1881–82 season, Clyde reached the semi-finals of the Scottish 2nd XI Cup in the competitions the first season. In 1896-97 they reached their first 'major' cup final, the Scottish 2nd XI Cup final eventually losing 4–0 to Hearts. After reaching the semi-finals again in 1905–06, they were thwarted by arch-rivals Partick Thistle this time.

The club first joined the Scottish Reserve League in 1909-10 and found the first few years of competing in the league though. It wasn't until the 1913–14 season when they made their mark when they lost 1–0 at Hearts in a league decider for the Reserve League title. It meant that the club missed out on a unique League and Cup double after they captured the Scottish 2nd XI Cup for the first time that season. They dispatched of St Mirren  in the final over two legs (1-1 away and 3–1 at home). They successfully defended the Scottish 2nd XI Cup the following season when Clyde overcame Falkirk in the final over two legs (2-1 loss away and a 3–1 home win).

Their third and final Scottish 2nd XI Cup triumph came in 1941–42. It would be the team's last 'major' cup success for the next sixty-six years. In 1945-46 they reached their last Scottish 2nd XI Cup final losing to Hibs, after a superb 6-2 derby victory over arch-rivals Partick Thistle in the semifinals.

The Scottish Reserve League merged with the Scottish C Division (third tier) for the 1949–50 season creating two regionalised divisions (South/West and North/East) with Clyde entering a reserve team in the South & West region. The club was crowned champions in 1949–50 and they retained their title in 1950–51. Despite successive titles, there was no promotion as only first teams could gain promotion to Division B. As reserve teams got excluded from the Scottish League Cup, the C Division had their League Cup. Clyde couldn't quite match the success in the cup that they had in the league as they never won the competition. The best they could manage were semi-final appearances in 1951-52 and in 1953–54.

League restructuring
After both regional C Divisions got scrapped in June 1955, a new Scottish Reserve League started up. The new Reserve League was an exclusively all First Division league (a mirror image of the senior league) and all Second Division clubs' reserve sides got excluded from joining. There were several seasons when not all clubs took part. As for teams who were turned away or excluded from joining, they joined various supplementary leagues over the next few years.

For the first few seasons between 1955 and 1960, Clyde regularly finished quite high up the table or at least in a mid-table position. From then onwards in the seasons they spent in the league, the team were often at the wrong end of the table.

In one of the seasons that Clyde didn't participate in the Reserve League, they joined the Combined Reserve League for a single season in 1961–62. Due to the small number of teams involved, the competition got split into an Autumn Series and Spring Series. The club won the Autumn Series and finished second overall in the Combined Table.

Just like Clyde's first team, whose last spell in the Scottish top flight came in 1974–75, the same fate happened to their reserve team following a further league restructure at senior and reserve level. The Reserve League set-up changed again in 1975 after a reorganisation of the 'senior' Scottish League into Premier-First-Second Divisions. The new Premier Reserve League was a mirror image of the new Scottish Premier Division in terms of membership. Lower league clubs used varying set-ups such as east–west sections and midweek competitions. In later games, clubs didn't always participate as running a reserve side became expensive.

It wasn't until season 1979–80 when Clyde gained membership to re-enter a reserve team in the Scottish Reserve League. They got placed in the regional West division. Finishing bottom in their first season, it was a further two seasons before they returned. They fared much better during the 1987–88 season when they won the division. It proved to be a one-off, though. Season 2000–01 was Clyde's last in the West Reserves League eventually before all reserves leagues got scrapped after season 2007–08.

Youth teams
The club ran youth teams at under-20, under-17, under-15, under-14, under-13, under-12, and under-11 level. There was an under-18 team until 2003, when it made way for under-17 and under-19 teams. The under-20 team replaced the under-19 team in 2014. The club also run Football Schools in Cumbernauld (since 2006) and Glasgow Southside (since 2008). Both schools have since been awarded the SFA Quality Mark Award at Standard Level and then at Development Level.

The Community Foundation received the Gold award in the SFA Quality Mark category for grassroots football. The Foundation also received the Young Start Award in 2017 to run a project called Start Young, Grow Young. The club were forced to scrap their youth academy from under 11 to under 17 levels in 2015 citing a reduction in funding from the Scottish FA, with the under-20 side the only youth team remaining, which acts as a feeder to the first team for young players.

The team reached the Scottish Youth Cup semi finals in 1988, but were beaten by Dunfermline Athletic. The under-17 team reached the SFL Youth Cup final in 2004 losing 4–1 on penalties to Hamilton Accies at New Douglas Park despite scoring in stoppage time of extra time to make it 1–1. Both of the under-19 and under-17 teams reached the semi finals of their SFL Youth Cups in 2006. The under-19 team finished runners-up behind Celtic in the inaugural SPFL under-19 league in 2014.

The under-19 team travelled to the Netherlands in 2003, taking part in a highly rated youth football programme called the Leonardo Project hosted by FC Dordrecht. They played three times against an under-19 team of the hosts, which contained Dutch youth internationalists, winning two and drawing one. In the third match, the opposition was made up of reserves and first team fringe players. They followed this up with a win over local amateur team vv Capelle and a narrow defeat to a youthful FC Utrecht team.

The Lanarkshire FA started the Lanarkshire Supercounty Trophy for all four senior Lanarkshire clubs' under-17 teams in 2013. Clyde beat Motherwell in the semi final, but lost to Accies in the final. The under-17's also reached their sectional League Cup final in 2017. The Community Foundation youth teams reached Divisional Cup finals in 2018 and 2019.

From the 2018–19 season, Clyde have replaced their Under 20 side with a project alongside North Lanarkshire Council called Project Braver, which will see young players play at youth level with a chance to progress to the first team, alongside providing further education or apprenticeship opportunities for the players.

Graduates
Graduates of the youth team who have gone on to play for the first team since moving to Broadwood Stadium include:

 Jamie Prunty
 Martin O'Neill
 Craig McEwan
 Brian Carrigan
 Paul Brownlie
 Michael O'Neill
 Paul Campbell
 John McLay
 Stuart Coleman
 Lorn Gibson
 Gary McPhee
 Gary Robertson
 Paul Stewart
 Paul Hay
 Graham McGhee
 Mark Gilhaney
 Paul Doyle
 Billy Reid Jnr.
 John Baird
 Charlie Clark
 Robert Halliday
 Craig Bryson
 David Greenhill
 Graeme McCracken
 Kevin Bradley
 John Paul McKeever
 Robert Harris
 Sean McKenna
 Ruari MacLennan
 David McGowan
 Michael Doherty
 Stephen Connolly
 Roddy MacLennan
 Jordan Murch
 Connor Stevenson
 Jordan Allan
 Steven Howarth
 Darren Walker
 Connor Cassidy
 Kevin Higgins
 Daniel Fitzpatrick
 Jack Sloss
 Drew Ramsay
 Kieran Daw
 Grant Dickie
 Scott Ferguson 
 Fraser McGhee
 Gordon Young 
 William Robb

Scottish internationals Pat Nevin, Steve Archibald and Ian Ferguson also came through the Clyde youth system.

Hall of Fame

Hall of Fame
The Dunn family (2011)
 George Herd (2011)
 Davie Laing (2011)
 Tommy McCulloch (2011)
 Pat Nevin (2011)
 Craig Brown (2012)
 Harry Hood (2012)
 Harry Haddock (2012)
 The 1966–67 Clyde squad (2014)
 Brian Ahern (2015)
 Keith Knox (2016)
 Tommy Ring (2016)
 Neil Hood (2017)

The club launched its official Hall of Fame in 2011, with five inaugural inductees. Three more were inducted in 2012. The Clyde team of season 1966–67 was inducted in 2014. There was one inducted in 2015. There is also a Hall of Fame section on the club website.

Honours

League 
Scottish Division One (Level 1)
Third place: 1908–09, 1911–12, 1966–67
Scottish Division Two (Level 2)
Winners (5): 1904–05, 1951–52, 1956–1957, 1961–62, 1972–73
Runners-up (4): 1903–04, 1905–06, 1925–26, 1963–64
SFL First Division (Level 2)
Runners-up: 2002–03, 2003–04
SFL Second Division (Level 3)
Winners (4): 1977–78, 1981–82, 1992–93, 1999–2000
SPFL League Two (Level 4)
Runners-up/Play-off Winners: 2018–19

Cup
Scottish Cup
Winners: 1938–39, 1954–55, 1957–58
Runners-up: 1909–10, 1911–12, 1948–49
Scottish Challenge Cup
Runners-up: 2006–07
B Division Supplementary Cup: 1951–52

Minor trophies 

Glasgow Cup: 1914–15, 1925–26, 1946–47, 1951–52, 1958–59
Runners-up: Fifteen times

Glasgow Merchants Charity Cup1: 1909–10, 1939–40, 1951–52, 1957–58, 1960–61
Runners-up: 1911–12, 1924–25, 1941–42, 1943–44, 1958–59

Southern League
Runners-up: 1940–41

Summer Cup
Runners-up: 1943–44

West of Scotland League / Shield: 1904–05, 1906–07
Runners-up: 1905–06

Glasgow & District Midweek League
Runners-up: 1912–13

Glasgow North Eastern Cup: 1890–91, 1892–93, 1893–94, 1894–95
Runners-up: 1882–83, 1885–86

Graham Cup: 1888–89, 1889–90, 1890–91

Paisley Charity Cup: 1938–39, 1939–40
Runners-up: 1944–45

St Vincent de Paul Charity Cup
Runners-up: 1938

Friendship Cup: 1960–61 (joint-winners)

1Clyde shared the trophy with Third Lanark in 1952 and with Celtic in 1961.

Friendly trophies 
Keyline Challenge Cup: 1999, 2000, 2001
Runners-up: 2002

Tommy McGrane Cup: 2006

Broadwood Cup: 2020

Optical Express Challenge Cup
Runners-up: 2005, 2009

Reserves

Youth
League Cup (under 17s):
Runners-up: 2004
Rangers Youth Invitational Tournament (under 13s):
Winners: 2008
Helensburgh Bi-Centennial Tournament (under 13s):
Winners: 2002
Kildrum United Football Festival (under 13s):
Winners: 2007
Oban Saints Youth Tournament (under 13s):
Runners-up: 2011
CKSSDA 11-a-side Tournament (under 12s):
Winners: 2008

Records

Record home attendance: 52,000 vs Rangers (28 November 1908) (at Shawfield Stadium); 8,000 vs Celtic (Scottish Cup) (8 January 2006) (at Broadwood Stadium)
Record win: 11–1 vs Cowdenbeath (6 October 1951), 10–0 vs Stranraer (14 August 1957)
Record European win: 4–0 vs RC Lens (7 August 1960)
Record loss: 11–0 vs Dumbarton (22 November 1897)
Most capped player: Tommy Ring: 12 (Scotland)
Most international goals: Tommy Ring: 2 (Scotland), Archie Robertson: 2 (Scotland)
Most goals in one season: Billy McPhail: 36 (1951–52), Basil Keogh: 36 (1956–57)
Youngest player: Connor Stevenson, aged 16 years and 245 days (against Queen of the South in the Scottish First Division on 15 April 2009)

All-time league appearances
As of 1 June 2020 (League only, includes appearances as substitute):

All-time league goalscorers
As of 1 July 2018 (League matches only, includes appearances as substitute):

Noted players

Internationalists 

A list of fully international capped players while they played for the club. Players are alphabetically ordered by nationality, forenames, and lastly surnames.

Frank Thompson (2 caps)

Jack Kirwan (1 cap)

Jack McGrillen (1 cap)

Ned Weir (1 cap)

Albie Murphy (1 cap)

Ned Weir (3 caps)

Alec Linwood (1 cap/1 goal)

Archie Robertson (5 caps/2 goals)

Billy Boyd (2 caps/1 goal)

Danny Blair (7 caps)

David Goodwillie (3 caps/1 goal)

George Herd (5 caps/1 goal)

 Harry Hood (3 caps)

Harry Haddock (6 caps)

Hugh Long (1 cap)

Jimmy Campbell (1 cap)

John Brown (1 cap)

Leslie Johnston (2 caps/1 goal)

Tommy Ring (12 caps/2 goals)

William Walker (2 caps)

References

External links

Clyde BBC My Club page
Historical Kits
Scottish 2nd XI Cup
Scottish Football Federation (Second version 1898-99)
Scottish Football Alliance (First version 1891-1897)
Scottish Football Alliance (Third version 1919-1938)
Scottish Football Alliance (Fifth version 1939-40)
Scottish Football Alliance (Sixth version 1956-57)
Scottish Reserve League (Second version 1909-191)
Scottish Reserve League (Third version 1938-39)
Scottish Reserve League (Fourth version 1945-1949)
Scottish Reserve League (Fifth version 1975-2008)
Scottish (Reserve) League (1955-1975)
C Division overview (1949-55)
Combined Reserve Football League (First version 1958-1972)
Combined Reserve Football League (Second and Third versions 1973-74 & 1975-76)

 
Cumbernauld
Rutherglen
Bridgeton–Calton–Dalmarnock
Association football clubs established in 1877
Football clubs in Scotland
Football clubs in Glasgow
Football in North Lanarkshire
Football in South Lanarkshire
1877 establishments in Scotland
Scottish Football League teams
Scottish Cup winners
Scottish Professional Football League teams
Sports team relocations